The Rainbow Round Table (RRT) of the American Library Association (ALA) is dedicated to supporting the information needs of LGBTQIA+ people, from professional library workers to the population at large.  Founded in 1970, it is the nation's first gay, lesbian, bisexual, and transgender professional organization.  While the current Rainbow moniker was adopted in 2019, the group has had various names during its 50-year history.

One of the core values of the organization is to reflect the diversity of the United States by "providing a full spectrum of resources and services to the communities" being served.

History
Originally established as the Task Force on Gay Liberation, part of ALA's Social Responsibilities Round Table (SRRT), the group was coordinated by Israel David Fishman in 1970, then by Barbara Gittings the following year.  Among its earliest endeavors, the Task Force campaigned for changes to the classification of library materials regarding the gay liberation movement. In the case of the Library of Congress Classification, materials had been designated to the scheme (HQ 71) for "Abnormal Sexual Relations, Including Sexual Crimes"; but after receiving the request from the Task Force, the Library of Congress in 1972 reclassified such books into the newly created scheme (HQ 76.5) for "Homosexuality, Lesbianism—Gay Liberation Movement, Homophile Movement".
 
The group became the Gay and Lesbian Task Force (GLTF) in 1986. American Libraries featured the group on the cover of its July/August 1992 issue, drawing both criticism and praise from the library world. Some critiqued the cover as being "in poor taste" and accused the magazine of "glorifying homosexuality", while others voiced support of the editorial decision. Christine Williams, who wrote an essay about the controversy surrounding the cover, concluded that in the mid-90s, the library world was "not an especially welcoming place to gays and lesbians."

The group became the Gay, Lesbian, and Bisexual Task Force (GLBTF) in 1995, then the Gay, Lesbian, Bisexual, and Transgender Round Table (GLBTRT) in 1999, a name change that endured for twenty years.

Awards and book lists
The Task Force established the Stonewall Book Award in 1971, recognizing titles of exceptional merit relating to LGBTQ+ life. The first award was given to Patience and Sarah by Isabel Miller.

In 2008 the GLBTRT compiled the inaugural Rainbow Book List of recent titles for children and teens. The effort expanded in 2010 to a list of Over the Rainbow Books, annual bibliographies of titles of interest to LGBTQ+ adults.  Both lists assist librarians selecting materials for their local collections.

Rainbow Book Month
Observed annually in June as a celebration of queer stories and authors, Rainbow Book Month was originally established in 1992 by the Publishing Triangle as National Lesbian and Gay Book Month. In 2015 the GLBTRT assumed oversight of the event, renamed GBLT Book Month. Efforts to increase the visibility of queer library materials include promoting the Rainbow Book and the Over the Rainbow Books lists, marketing on social media, and providing tools to library workers.  In 2020 the month-long observance became Rainbow Book Month.

See also
 Libraries and the LGBTQ community

References

External links

Open to All: Serving the GLBT Community in Your Library (2015)
 Rainbow Round Table News

American Library Association
LGBT and education
LGBT organizations in the United States
American librarianship and human rights
1970 establishments in the United States